Kubina is a Polish language surname from the personal name Jakub. Notable people with the name include:
 Eugene G. Kubina (1948), American educator and businessman
 Pavel Kubina (1977), Czech former professional ice hockey defenceman

See also 
 Kuba (surname)

References 

Polish-language surnames
Surnames from given names